Gibraltar Pistol Association (GPA) is the Gibraltarian association for practical shooting under the International Practical Shooting Confederation.

References 

Sports organisations of Gibraltar
Regions of the International Practical Shooting Confederation
Regions of the World Association PPC 1500